Tiran ( Jezîret Tīrān, Jazīrat Tīrān),  and Yotvat Island, is a Saudi Arabian island that was formerly administered by Egypt. Sovereignty of the two Red Sea islands, Tiran and Sanafir, was ceded officially to Saudi Arabia as part of a maritime borders agreement between Egypt and Saudi Arabia. The agreement subsequently was approved by the Egyptian Parliament and finally ratified by the Egyptian President on 24 June 2017.

The island is located at the entrance of the Straits of Tiran, which connect the Red Sea to the Gulf of Aqaba. It was part of the Ras Muhammad National Park. The Straits of Tiran are Israel's only access from the Gulf of Aqaba to the Red Sea, and Egypt's blockade of the Straits of Tiran on 22 May 1967 was the casus belli for Israel in the Six-Day War.

Tiran Island is of strategic significance in the area, as it forms the narrowest section of the Straits of Tiran, which is an important sea passage to the major ports of Aqaba in Jordan and Eilat in Israel. Israel briefly took over Tiran Island during the Suez Crisis and again from 1967 to 1982 following the Six-Day War. The island is inhabited only by military personnel from Egypt and the Multinational Force and Observers (MFO).

Chisholm Point is a cape of Tiran Island.

Some sources report that many beaches on the island are mined.

On 9 April 2016, the Egyptian government declared that Tiran and Sanafir Island fall within the territorial waters of Saudi Arabia, as codified in the maritime border agreement signed with the government of Saudi Arabia on the previous day. The agreement needed to be ratified by Egypt's Parliament, and has reportedly been quashed by an Egyptian judge. A court in its final ruling rejected the deal and affirmed Egyptian sovereignty over the islands in January 2017.

On 14 June 2017, Egypt's House Committee on Defence and National Security unanimously approved the transfer of Tiran and Sanafir islands to Saudi Arabia and the plan was passed by the Egyptian Parliament later the same day. On Wednesday 21 June 2017, Egypt’s top court temporarily halted all court verdicts on the agreement to transfer the two Red Sea islands to Saudi Arabia. Finally, on Saturday 24 June 2017, President Abdel Fattah el-Sisi of Egypt ratified the agreement that cedes sovereignty over the two Red Sea islands, Tiran and Sanafir, to Saudi Arabia. On 14 July 2022, Israel agreed to the deal.

Ancient history - Iotabe 

Tiran may be the island that Procopius called Iotabe (in ), which was an important toll station for shipping in the area, but other islands in the Gulf of Aqaba have been proposed as alternative identifications. In 473 a Saracen named Amorkesos captured the island and appropriated the revenues, but the Byzantine Empire retook it 25 years later, granting its inhabitants autonomy, subject to payment of taxes on goods exported to India. Around 534, the Byzantines had to retake it again from a group whom Choricius of Gaza called an unholy race, and whom some scholars suppose to have been the Jewish inhabitants who had refused to pay the taxes.

The earliest and latest dates mentioned in relation to Iotabe are given in relation to the participation of bishops of the island in the church councils: Macarius in the Council of Chalcedon in 451 (in whose acts the diocese is listed as belonging to the Roman province of Palaestina Tertia), and Anastasius in a synod held at Jerusalem in 536.

There is no mention of Iotape in accounts of the Islamic conquests, suggesting that by then the island was uninhabited.

Since it is no longer a residential bishopric, Iotape, in its Latin form called Iotapa in Palaestina, is today listed by the Roman Catholic Church as a titular see.

The reference by Procopius to an autonomous Jewish community on the island of Iotabe until the 6th century figured in Israeli rhetoric during the Suez crisis and during and immediately after the Six-Day War.

Modern history

Early Egyptian control 

"Egypt and Saudi Arabia clarified their sovereignty claims to the islands in 1954, when Egypt informed the UN Security Council that the two islands had been Egyptian territory since the delimitation of the frontier between Egypt and the Ottoman Empire in 1906."

However, according to the Ministry of Foreign Affairs of Israel the islands had not belonged to Egypt before 1949.

During World War II, the Egyptian forces on Tiran and Sinafir islands were part of the contingent of Egyptian troops protecting the Suez Canal, according to Egypt's representative at the 659th UN Security Council meeting on 15 February 1954. In the same meeting, Egypt's representative considered Tiran and Sinafir islands an integral part of the territory of Egypt since they have been under Egypt's administration since 1906.

Israeli passage 

In March 1949, Israeli forces took control of the area around the coastal village of Umm al-Rashrash, later renamed Eilat, as part of Operation Uvda. The uninhabited islands of Tiran and Sanafir gained strategic importance since they controlled all shipping to Eilat, Israel's only access to the Red Sea. In May 1948, Egypt blocked passage through the Suez Canal to Israeli-registered ships and to ships (Israeli or otherwise) carrying cargo to and from all Israeli ports. Since all land trade routes were blocked by other Arab states, Israel's ability to trade with East Africa and Asia, mainly to import oil from the Persian Gulf, was severely hampered.

In December 1949 Egypt started to erect military installations on Tiran, Sanafir and the Sinai coast opposite the islands to control the straits. Soon after, the Egyptian Government officially denied an intention to interfere with peaceful navigation, communicating its accord with Saudi Arabia to the UK and the US on 30 January and 28 February 1950 respectively:

In the same accord, Egypt claimed its right to the islands as well as possible right for the Kingdom of Saudi Arabia:

2016–22 transfer 

As Saudi media explained in 2016, Saudi King Abdel Aziz al-Saud granted Egypt permission to defend the islands since he was afraid of possible Israeli expansion while his kingdom lacked a suitable naval force to protect them.

According to a 2016 statement by the Egyptian Cabinet Information and Decision Support Centre, the Egyptian Chief Delegate to the UN had denied any territorial claims on the islands in May 1967, after the then Egyptian President Gamal Abd al-Nasser closed the Straits of Tiran to Israeli shipping (which was considered as a casus belli by Israel to initiate the Six-Day War): "Egypt did not seek at any time to claim that the sovereignty of the two islands has been transferred to it. Rather Egypt sought only to take over defending the two islands." Shortly thereafter Tiran Island was captured by Israeli Defence Forces troops during the Six-Day War. In January 1968, the US government stood behind a failed attempt to induce Israeli withdrawal from that island as an opening move to a larger peace process.

Tiran remained under Israeli control until its return to Egypt in 1982 in fulfilment of the 1979 peace treaty signed by Egypt and Israel. The treaty includes a guarantee of freedom of Israeli shipping through the Straits of Tiran.

The agreement by Egypt to handover the islands of Tiran and Sanafir to Saudi Arabia required the approval of Israel to modify the military annex to the peace treaty. Israel was notified in writing about the transfer weeks before it was made public, and gave its approval in writing to Egypt and, indirectly, to Saudi Arabia. Saudi Foreign Minister Adel al-Jubeir publicly stated that his country would honour the Egypt–Israel peace treaty's terms as regards the island and the continued stationing of the Multinational Force and Observers (MFO) forces on the island. Israel also agreed to the construction of the Saudi–Egypt Causeway between the Egyptian and Saudi mainlands which would pass through Tiran.

However, an Egyptian court issued a final ruling, rejecting the transfer of the islands to Saudi Arabia after a team of lawyers have presented historical documents in support of Egypt’s ownership of the islands, both historically and geographically, before the court. The court confirmed Egypt's sovereignty over the two islands and stated that the government failed to provide evidence that the islands belonged to Saudi Arabia.

On 14 June 2017, Egypt's House Committee on Defence and National Security unanimously approved the transfer of Tiran and Sanafir islands to Saudi Arabia and the plan was passed by the Egyptian Parliament later the same day. On Wednesday 21 June 2017, Egypt’s top court temporarily halted all court verdicts on the agreement to transfer the two Red Sea islands to Saudi Arabia. Finally, on Saturday 24 June 2017, President Abdel Fattah el-Sisi of Egypt ratified the agreement that cedes sovereignty over the two Red Sea islands, Tiran and Sanafir, to Saudi Arabia. On 14 July 2022, Israel agreed to the deal between Saudi Arabia and Egypt.

Transport 

The planned Saudi-Egypt Causeway would pass through Tiran Island.

See also 

 Sanafir Island
 Straits of Tiran

Notes

External links 

 Observation Post 3-11, Tiran Island, GlobalSecurity.org
 BirdLife Factsheet - Tiran Island
 Tiran Island , Tourist info

Islands of the Red Sea
Uninhabited islands of Saudi Arabia
Catholic titular sees in Asia
Former disputed land areas
Egypt–Saudi Arabia relations